Jon Caramanica (born 1975) is an American journalist and pop music critic who writes for The New York Times. He is also known for writing about hip hop music.

Biography
Born in Brooklyn, New York, Caramanica received his bachelor's degree from Harvard University in 1997, after which he attended Goldsmiths, University of London. He has published articles in Rolling Stone and Spin, before becoming a senior contributing writer for XXL. In 2006, he left XXL to become the music editor for Vibe, a position he held until leaving the magazine in 2008. He began working for The New York Times in 2010, after previously having freelanced for the paper. He also hosts the music podcast Popcast. In 2020, he announced he is writing a book about Kanye West.

See also 
 Album era

References

Living people
People from Brooklyn
The New York Times writers
American music critics
Harvard University alumni
Alumni of Goldsmiths, University of London
1975 births
American music journalists